Moka Blast  (born September 22, 1979), also known by the stage names Ladies Love Moka or Blast the Beautiful, is an American rapper, singer, songwriter, videographer, and entrepreneur. He worked independently with multiple production companies, music labels, and talent agencies in North America, Europe, Asia and Africa. Moka also runs his own barbershop franchise in Las Vegas, launched 2020.

Early life 
Lydell Birch was born on September 22, 1979, in Trinidad and Tobago and lives in the United States.

Career 
In 2014, Moka Blast released a mixtape with DJ Superstar Jay. Birch appeared on the cover of Coast 2 Coast, which ran an interview with him about his experiences.

In 2015, Moka Blast appeared in the late summer 2015 edition of Hypefresh.

In 2016 he released the album Blast Radiius.

Before the release of his second album, The Blast Supper in spring 2017, Birch performed on tour with British musician Lady Leshurr in the U.K. From February through May of that year, he also went on a group tour in the U.S.

In 2016, he launched a clothing line.

Discography 
 Blast Radiius (2016)
 The Blast Supper (2017)
 The Blast Testament (2017)
  Irritable (2019)
 Sorry I Took so Long (2022)

References

External links 
 

American people of Trinidad and Tobago descent
1979 births
Living people